Novo Selo is a village in the municipality of Struga, North Macedonia.

Demographics
As of the 2021 census, Novo Selo had 228 residents with the following ethnic composition:
Albanians 162
Others 53
Persons for whom data are taken from administrative sources 13

According to the 2002 census, the village had a total of 280 inhabitants. Ethnic groups in the village include:
Albanians 235
Others 45

References

External links

Villages in Struga Municipality
Albanian communities in North Macedonia